Gnathophyllum elegans is a species of shrimps found in the Mediterranean and the Atlantic Ocean. The type specimen was found near Nice, France. Also found in Ecuador It is active at night.

References

External links
 
 

Palaemonoidea
Crustaceans described in 1816